Parkius is a monotypic genus of crustaceans belonging to the monotypic family Parkiidae. The only species is Parkius karenwishnerae.

The species is found in Atlantic and Pacific Ocean.

References

Calanoida
Monotypic crustacean genera
Copepod genera